The 2020 New Caledonia Super Ligue is the 47th season of the New Caledonia Super Ligue, the top-flight football league in New Caledonia. The season started on 14 March 2020. However, it was suspended after the first round due to the COVID-19 pandemic. The season resumed on 11 July 2020 and would be extended to play until 2021. However, it ended in December 2020.
Hienghène Sport are the defending champions.

On 7 November, under new direction, FCF suggested changing the format of the ongoing competition. Thus, it was agreed that the regular phase would end with 9 rounds and none of the teams would be relegated. And to define the champion and the classifieds for the OFC Champions League, it was adding a playoff among the top 4. The proposal was accepted before round 9 was held. It was also agreed that the 2021 edition will have 13 participating clubs. Because, in addition to the 10 participants in this edition (since no club has been demoted), the three promoted from the 2020 edition of the lower division will be included.

Teams
A total of ten teams compete in the league:
JS Baco
Hienghène Sport
AS Horizon Patho
AS Kunié
AS Lössi
AS Magenta
AS Mont-Dore
SC Ne Drehu
AS Tiga Sport
AS Wetr

Trio Kedeigne and Wacaelé were relegated from last season, and were replaced by promoted teams Baco and Kunié.

Regular Stage

Table

Matches

Round 1
14 [Mar]

Magenta             6-0 Kunié
             
Tiga                2-0 Mont-Dore
          
Baco                0-4 Wetr
            
Hienghène           5-1 Horizon Patho
       
Ne Drehu            2-1 Lössi

Round 2
[11 Jul]

Kunié               1-6 Lössi
               
Tiga                1-2 Magenta
             
Hienghène           awd Mont-Dore           [awarded 3-0, Mont-Dore forfeited]

[12 Jul]

Wetr                2-2 Ne Drehu
            
[18 Jul]

Horizon Patho       4-0 Baco

Round 3
[25 Jul]

Mont-Dore           2-2 Horizon Patho
       
Baco                1-2 Ne Drehu
            
Magenta             3-2 Hienghène           

[Jul 26]

Wetr                3-3 Kunié
               
Lössi               1-3 Tiga

Round 4
[8 Aug]
Lössi               1-2 Hienghène
           
Tiga                1-0 Wetr                

[9 Aug]

Kunié               1-2 Baco
                
Mont-Dore           3-3 Magenta             

[15 Aug]

Horizon Patho       3-2 Ne Drehu

Round 5
[22 Aug]

Wetr                4-4 Hienghène
           
Lössi               1-1 Mont-Dore
           
Horizon Patho       2-1 Magenta
             
Baco                1-5 Tiga                

[23 Aug]
 
Kunié               1-1 Ne Drehu

Round 6
[19 Sep]

Magenta             1-1 Lössi
               
Wetr                4-0 Mont-Dore
           
Hienghène           3-1 Baco
                
Horizon Patho       3-0 Kunié               

[20 Sep]

Tiga                1-1 Ne Drehu

Round 7
[24 Oct]

Lössi               1-3 Horizon Patho
       
Hienghène           1-0 Ne Drehu
            
Wetr                0-1 Magenta             

[25 Oct]

Kunié               1-5 Tiga
                
Mont-Dore           2-0 Baco

Round 8
[7 Nov]

Tiga                2-2 Horizon Patho
       
Hienghène           2-1 Kunié
               
Mont-Dore           1-1 Ne Drehu            

[8 Nov]

Magenta             7-1 Baco
                
Lössi               2-3 Wetr

Round 9
[21 Nov]

Tiga                3-1 Hienghène
           
Mont-Dore           3-0 Kunié               

[22 Nov]

Magenta             1-1 Ne Drehu
            
Wetr                5-1 Horizon Patho
       
Baco                1-2 Lössi

Playoff Stage

Table

Matches

Round 1
[29 Nov, stade Numa Daly, Nouméa]

Hienghène           2-2 Tiga
                
Horizon Patho       1-1 Magenta

Round 2
[5 Dec, stade Numa Daly, Nouméa]

Tiga                2-0 Horizon Patho
       
Hienghène           2-2 Magenta

Round 3
[19 Dec, stade Yoshida, Koné]

Tiga                2-0 Magenta
             
Hienghène           2-3 Horizon Patho

Playoff clubs' stadiums

References

External links
Fédération Calédonienne de Football

New Caledonia Super Ligue seasons
New Caledonia
New Caledonia
2020 in New Caledonian football
2021 in New Caledonian football